The New Pass Range is a mountain range in Lander and Churchill counties of Nevada. US Route 50 crosses New Pass Summit on the south end of the range between Austin to the east and Fallon on to the west. The range was named from an early settler's belief that his route through the mountains was a "new pass" through the area.

The Desatoya Mountains lie to the southwest and the Clan Alpine Mountains to the west. To the north is the Augusta Mountains with Antelope Valley to the northeast. To the east is Ravenswood Mountain at the south end of the Shoshone Range and Nevada State Route 305. To the southeast across the Reese River Valley is Austin at the north end of the Toiyabe Range.

References 

Mountain ranges of Nevada
Mountain ranges of Churchill County, Nevada
Mountain ranges of Lander County, Nevada